Francesco Romano (born 25 April 1960, in Saviano) is a retired Italian footballer, who played as a midfielder. Romano was a creative deep-lying playmaker with notable technical ability, vision, passing, and tactical intelligence, who excelled at dictating the tempo of his team's play in midfield, and at providing assists for teammates. He is a former Italian international, and also a former Italy U-21 international. He currently works as a football agent.

Club career

During his club career Romano played for Reggiana (1977–79), Milan (1979–83), Triestina (1983–86), Napoli (1986–1989), Torino (1989–91), Venezia (1991–93), Triestina (1993–94), and Palazzolo (1994–95).

During his time with Milan he won two Serie B titles in 1981 and 1983, as well as the Mitropa Cup in 1982. After joining Napoli from Triestina in October 1986, he won a Serie A-Coppa Italia double during his first season, the club's first ever league title, starring in a team which featured Diego Maradona; Romano later also added the 1988–89 UEFA Cup to his trophy cabinet during his time with the club. With Torino, he won another Serie B title in 1990, as well as his second Mitropa Cup in 1991.

International career
In 1981 Romano was capped by Italy U-21. In total he made 2 appearances for the Under-21 side between 1981 and 1982.

Despite being named by manager Azeglio Vicini in the Italian Squad for the 1988 UEFA European Football Championship's, where the team reached the semi-finals, he never earned an official cap for Italy at the senior level after being an unused substitute in the tournament.

Honours
Napoli
 Serie A champion: 1986–87.
 Coppa Italia winner: 1986–87.
 UEFA Cup winner: 1988–89.

Milan
 Mitropa Cup winner: 1981–82.
 Serie B winner: 1980–81, 1982–83.

Torino
 Mitropa Cup winner: 1991.
 Serie B winner: 1989–90

References

External links

1960 births
Living people
Italian footballers
Italy under-21 international footballers
Serie A players
Serie B players
Serie C players
UEFA Euro 1988 players
A.C. Reggiana 1919 players
A.C. Milan players
U.S. Triestina Calcio 1918 players
S.S.C. Napoli players
Torino F.C. players
Venezia F.C. players
Association football midfielders
UEFA Cup winning players
People from Saviano